Anisodactylus opaculus is a ground beetle in the family Carabidae ("ground beetles"), in the suborder Adephaga ("ground and water beetles").
Anisodactylus opaculus is found in North America.

References

Further reading
 American Beetles, Volume I: Archostemata, Myxophaga, Adephaga, Polyphaga: Staphyliniformia, Arnett, R.H. Jr., and M. C. Thomas. (eds.). 2000. CRC Press LLC, Boca Raton, FL.
 American Insects: A Handbook of the Insects of America North of Mexico, Ross H. Arnett. 2000. CRC Press.
 Bousquet, Yves (2012). Catalogue of Geadephaga (Coleoptera, Adephaga) of America, north of Mexico. ZooKeys, issue 245, 1–1722.
 Bousquet, Yves, and André Larochelle (1993). Catalogue of the Geadephaga (Coleoptera: Trachypachidae, Rhysodidae, Carabidae including Cicindelini) of America North of Mexico. Memoirs of the Entomological Society of Canada, no. 167, 397.
 Peterson Field Guides: Beetles, Richard E. White. 1983. Houghton Mifflin Company.

Anisodactylus
Beetles described in 1863